Escadron de Chasse 1/7 Provence (Fighter Squadron) is a French Air and Space Force (Armée de l'air et de l'espace) fighter squadron currently stationed at BA 104 Al Dhafra Air Base which flies the Dassault Rafale B & C.

In 2006 it was the first unit to fly the Dassault Rafale. The Squadron’s aircraft are marked 113-HA to 113-HZ.

History

 Groupe de Chasse I/7 : from 1932 until October 1942
 Groupe de Chasse I/7 Provence : from November 1, 1943 until July 1, 1947 	  	
 Groupe de Chasse I/1 Provence : from July 1, 1947 until November 17, 1951 
 Escadron de Chasse 1/7 Provence : as of March 1, 1962

Origins until the Second World War 

The EC 1/7 Provence originated as Groupe de Chasse 1/7 GC 1/7 (Fighter Group) Dijon in 1932. In turn, it traces its own origin back to two World War I squadrons: Escadrille Spa.15 and Escadrille Spa.77. In January 1939 the fighter group 1/7 relocated to Tunisia, and subsequently moved to Egypt after the 1940 armistice. It was disbanded in October 1942.

Successive attachments included:
 1ere Escadre de Chasse : du 1 au 17
 7e Escadre de Chasse : du 1 au 22
 4e Escadre de Chasse : du 26 au 24

Indochina and Algeria 

GC 1/7 was recreated in September 1943 as No. 328 Squadron RAF flying Spitfire Mark VB aircraft and participated in the North Africa campaign, the  campaign to liberate Corsica and the Operation Dragoon, the landings in Provence, thus prompting the name Provence. At the end of World War II, the unit was awarded the "Croix de guerre 1939–1945 (France)" and from December 1945 to  January 1946, it received a consignment of captured Japanese Nakajima Ki-43 "Hayabusa" fighter planes. Groupe de Chasse 1/7  received its first Mistral in April 1953, participated in the Algerian War and was reequipped with Dassault Mystère IV operating out of Dijon military base. It was disbanded in September 1961.

Escadron de Chasse 1/7 Provence was recreated in March 1962 at Nancy – Ochey Air Base (Air Base 133), using Mystère IV. In 1973, the Squadron became the first Air force unit to be equipped with the SEPECAT Jaguar and relocated to BA 113 Saint-Dizier – Robinson Air Base. 1/7 Provence Jaguars engaged in combat missions in Mauritania (1978), in Chad (1980’s), in the Gulf War (1990-1991) and in Bosnia. After the  Escadron de Chasse 2/11 Vosges was disbanded,  1/7 Provence was expanded to 3 flights: la SPA 91 (Eagle on a skull) in December 1996.

The Jaguar (JAG) era 

In July 2001 the squadron received several two-seat Jaguars and the Dassault/Dornier Alpha Jets previously used by Escadron de Chasse 2/7 Argonne.

The Rafale era 

The Jaguars were retired in July 2005 and replaced by Dassault Rafale one year later. In January 2007 1/7 Provence had twenty Rafale B and C. In March 2007 three Rafales were deployed to Dushanbe in Tajikistan, and carried out their first patrol over Afghanistan two days later.

In September 2007, 1/7 Provence Squadron’s Alpha Jets were transferred to the newly recreated Escadron d'Entraînement 3/8 Côte d'Or (EE 3/8 Côte d'Or).

Constituent Escadrilles

 Escadrille 15
 Escadrille Spa.77
GC III/7(6) Furie (since August 24, 2016)

Bases
 BA 113 Saint-Dizier – Robinson Air Base 
 Haguenau Airport: From December 25, 1944 until January 2, 1945
 Po Chen Tong Air Base : from November 17, 1945 until July 1, 1947
 Aerial Base 141 Oran la  Sénia : from April 1947 until end of 1950 
 Aerial Base 156 Bizerte Sidi Ahmed : end of 1950 until December 1961 de fin 1950 à décembre 1961
 BA 133 Nancy – Ochey Air Base : from December 1961 until May 1973 
 BA 113 Saint-Dizier – Robinson Air Base : from May 1973 until June 24, 2016
 BA 104 Al Dhafra Air Base : since June 24, 2016

Aircraft

 Nakajima Ki-43 II Hayabusa (from 1945 to 1946)
 Supermarine Spitfire (from 1946 to 1953)
 De Havilland Vampire (from 1953 to 1962)
 Dassault Mystère IV (from 1962 to 1973)
 SEPECAT Jaguar (from 1973 to 2005)
 Dassault/Dornier Alpha Jet (2001–2007, aircraft marked 7-PA to 7-PZ)
 Dassault Rafale (since 2006)

References

Bibliography

 Franks, Norman; Bailey, Frank (1993). Over the Front: The Complete Record of the Fighter Aces and Units of the United States and French Air Services, 1914–1918 London, UK: Grub Street Publishing. .

Fighter squadrons of the French Air and Space Force
Military units and formations established in 1932